Deir or DEIR may refer to:

Ad Deir or The Monastery, a building in Petra, Jordan
Tell Deir, an archaeological site in Lebanon
Deir ez-Zor or Ad-Deir, a city in Syria
Draft environmental impact report, a document required in United States environmental law

People with the surname
Edward Deir (1915–1990), Canadian canoeist

See also
 , includes many place names and names of buildings, as deir is Arabic for 'monastery' or 'convent'
 
 Dair, the seventh letter of the Ogham alphabet
 Der (disambiguation)
 Deyr (disambiguation)